This is a list of college basketball games televised on ESPN's Saturday Primetime since it debuted on January 22, 2005.

2005

2006

2007

2008
-Overtime

2009

2010
Italics-Women's Basketball
-Overtime

2011
Italics-Women's Basketball

2012

2013
-overtime
-five overtimes

2014
-overtime

2015
-overtime

College basketball in the United States lists
ESPN College Basketball
College basketball on television in the United States